No Kwang-chol (Hanja: 努光鐵; born 1956) is a North Korean soldier, a four-star general, and a member of the political bureau.

Biography
He was elected as a member of the Supreme People's Assembly following the 2003 election and 2009 election. In the September 2010 Representative Conference, he was elected as an alternate (candidate) member of the Central Committee of the Workers' Party of Korea. In December 2011, Kim Jong Il died and he was included as one of the members of his funeral committee.

In June 2018, he was promoted from first vice minister to Minister of People's Armed Forces. In December 2019 he was replaced by Kim Jong-gwan. Between April 2019 to April 2020 he served as a member of the State Affairs Commission. 

On June 12, 2018, Trump and Kim Jong Un were meeting in Singapore. At the meeting, Trump wanted to shake hands with No, who was accompanying Kim Jong-un in the meeting, but No did not shake hands but saluted Trump. After Trump hesitated, he saluted him and the two shook hands. Because the United States and North Korea are technically still at war, Trump’s salute has triggered controversy and criticism of Trump in the United States.

Awards and honors 
A picture of No shows him wearing the ribbons to all decorations awarded to him.

References 

1956 births
Living people
North Korean generals
People from Nampo
Members of the 8th Central Committee of the Workers' Party of Korea